Lisu Supplement is a Unicode block containing supplementary characters of the Fraser alphabet, which is used to write the Lisu language. This is a supplement to the main Lisu block, with currently only a single character used for the Naxi language assigned to it.

Block

History
The following Unicode-related documents record the purpose and process of defining specific characters in the Lisu Supplement block:

References 

Unicode blocks